Volodymyr Rybak (30 November 1971 – c. 17 April 2014) was a Ukrainian politician, representative of the Horlivka city council, kidnapped and then murdered by the pro-Russian militia on 17 April 2014. It was one of the first war crimes alleged to have been committed by pro-Russian forces during the Russo-Ukrainian War.

Biography
Rybak was born in the city of Horlivka in 1971. In 1995 he graduated the Automobile Highway Institute of the Donetsk National Technical University and in 2002 – the Interregional Academy of Personnel Management.

In 1995–2009 Rybak worked in the division of Criminal Investigation for the Horlivka city militsiya. In 2009 he joined the All-Ukrainian Association Fatherland (Batkivshchyna) and next year headed its city's party cell.

Since November 2010 Rybak was a member of the Horlivka city council. During the 2012 Ukrainian parliamentary election, as a Batkivshchyna candidate, he ran for the Ukrainian parliament at the 41st electoral district (the Budonivskyi District of Donetsk) placing 4th with 5,195 votes (4.55%, winner  of the Party of Regions won the district with 80.85% of the votes).

Rybak was an active supporter of the 2013–2014 Euromaidan protest.

Rybak was abducted by separatists on 17 April 2014 after trying to raise the flag of Ukraine on Horlivka's town council building. Later his body with signs of torture was found in the River Torets, along with other two bodies. According to forensic reports, the victims were drowned being still alive and their bodies were covered with burns and stabs and their stomachs ripped open. The two other victims were Kyiv Polytechnic Institute student Yuriy Popravka and 25-year-old Yuriy Diakovsky.

In 2015 a memorial plaque was placed in Sloviansk after its liberation from Russian forces.

In May 2020 Igor Strelkov, a key organizer of the Donetsk People's Republic's militant groups confessed in an interview with Ukrainian journalist Dmitry Gordon that he bore some responsibility for the killing of Rybak: "Naturally, Rybak, as a person who actively opposed the "militias", was an enemy in my eyes. And his death, probably, is to some extent also under my responsibility".

See also 
 Murder of Pentecostals in Sloviansk
 Stepan Chubenko
 Volnovakha bus attack
 January 2015 Mariupol rocket attack
 Malaysia Airlines Flight 17
 Izolyatsia prison
 February 2015 Kramatorsk rocket attack
 Donetsk "Donetskhirmash" bus station attack

References

External links
 Biography politrada.com
 Biography at the Horlivka city portal
 Volodymyr Rybak speaks frankly: Cops are jackasses, mayor – a puppet, communists – traitors. Horlivka city portal
 Chronology of brutal murder of Rybak that happened in Sloviansk. Broadcasting Service of News (TSN).

1971 births
2014 deaths
People from Horlivka
Donetsk National Technical University alumni
Interregional Academy of Personnel Management alumni
All-Ukrainian Union "Fatherland" politicians
People of the 2014 pro-Russian unrest in Ukraine
Ukrainian victims of human rights abuses
Ukrainian torture victims
Ukrainian people taken hostage
Pro-Ukrainian people of the war in Donbas
People killed in the war in Donbas
Recipients of the Order of Gold Star (Ukraine)
People murdered in Ukraine 
2014 murders in Ukraine  
Russian war crimes in Ukraine